Juhan Jaik (13 January 1899 – 10 December 1948) was an Estonian writer and journalist.

Jaik was born at Sänna Manor in Rõuge Parish, Võru County. He took part in the Estonian War of Independence. In 1920s and 1930s, he lived in Tallinn, working as a journalist and as a clerk. From 1936 to 1940, he was a consultant for the Ministry of Education. During World War II, he escaped to Sweden. He died in Stora Malm Parish, Katrineholm Municipality in 1948. In 1990, his ashes were returned to Estonia and interred at Rahumäe Cemetery in the Nõmme district of Tallinn.

Selected works
 1924 poetry collection "Rõuge kiriku kell" ('The Bell of the Rõuge Church')
 1924-1933: story "Võrumaa jutud I-II" ('Tales from Võrumaa' I-II)
 1999 (posthumously): "Tiroliaana" ('Tiroliana')

References

1899 births
1948 deaths
Estonian journalists
Estonian male short story writers
Estonian male poets
20th-century Estonian poets
20th-century Estonian writers
Estonian World War II refugees
Estonian emigrants to Sweden
Estonian military personnel of the Estonian War of Independence
People from Rõuge Parish
Burials at Rahumäe Cemetery